Jerry Orbach was an American actor of the stage and screen. Orbach is most known for his for long running lead role as Det. Lenny Briscoe in Law & Order from 1992 to 2004. He also made appearances on Murder, She Wrote and The Golden Girls.

He originally starred on the Broadway stage appearing in the original production of Guys and Dolls in 1965. He also starred in Carousel that same year, Annie Get Your Gun in 1966, Promises, Promises in 1968, and Chicago in 1975. Orbach also made appearances in film including small roles in Guys and Dolls (1955), Marty (1955), and Bye Bye Birdie (1963). He gained greater attention for his performances in Sidney Lumet's Prince of the City (1981), and Woody Allen's Crimes and Misdemeanors (1989). He earned affection from audiences for his roles in romantic drama Dirty Dancing (1987), and his voice role as Lumiere in the Walt Disney Animated classic Beauty and the Beast (1991).

Filmography

Film

Source: Turner Classic Movies

Television

Theatre

Other

Video games

Theme park

References 

Male actor filmographies
American filmographies